The 1981–82 Yugoslav Second League season was the 36th season of the Second Federal League, the second level association football competition of SFR Yugoslavia, since its establishment in 1946. The league was contested in two regional groups (West Division and East Division), with 16 clubs each.

West Division

Teams
A total of sixteen teams contested the league, including twelve sides from the 1980–81 season, one club relegated from the 1980–81 Yugoslav First League and three sides promoted from the Inter-Republic Leagues played in the 1980–81 season. The league was contested in a double round robin format, with each club playing every other club twice, for a total of 30 rounds. Two points were awarded for wins and one point for draws.

Borac Banja Luka were relegated from the 1980–81 Yugoslav First League after finishing in the 17th place of the league table. The three clubs promoted to the second level were Kikinda, Kozara and Solin.

At the winter break, Svoboda stepped out of the league meaning a total of 29 rounds was played in the season. Due to expansion of league to 18 teams in the following season, only two teams were relegated, Svoboda and Rudar Velenje.

League table

East Division

Teams
A total of sixteen teams contested the league, including eleven sides from the 1980–81 season, one club relegated from the 1980–81 Yugoslav First League and four sides promoted from the Inter-Republic Leagues played in the 1980–81 season. The league was contested in a double round robin format, with each club playing every other club twice, for a total of 30 rounds. Two points were awarded for wins and one point for draws.

Napredak Kruševac were relegated from the 1980–81 Yugoslav First League after finishing in the 18th place of the league table. The four clubs promoted to the second level were Liria, Mogren, Pobeda and Timok.

Due to expansion of league to 18 teams in the following season, only two teams were relegated, Mogren and Pobeda.

League table

See also
1981–82 Yugoslav First League
1981–82 Yugoslav Cup

References
General

Yugoslav Second League seasons
Yugo
2